Frederick Morgan Padelford (1875–1942), pronounced Pa-DEL-ford, was an American professor and author. He worked at the University of Washington in Seattle for 41 years. He chaired the English Department and served as dean of the graduate school. The Orbis Cascade Alliance has a collection of his papers.

Padelford graduated with a B.A. from Colby College (1896) and a PhD from Yale (1899). He also received an LLD from Mills College in 1936.

He was a Spenserian scholar. A review of one of his works described him as writing with great spirit and mastery of evidence.

He married Jessie Elizabeth (Bessie) Pepper (1874–1967). Her father was President of Colby College. Their children were Morgan, Charlie, Eunice, and Philip Sidney Padelford (June 8, 1912 – October 12, 2009).

Padelford hall, a building on the UW campus, was named in his honor.

Bibliography
The Political and Ecclesiastical Allegory of the First Book of the Faerie Queene (1911) published by Ginn and Company in Boston
Early sixteenth century lyrics
Old English musical terms
Select translations from Scaliger's Poetics by Frederick Morgan Padelford.
Samuel Osborne, janitor, about "Janitor Sam" Osborne, an African American whose history and treatment at Colby College is controversial and for whom the president's house at Colby is now named.
The comedy of errors, by William Shakespeare, ed. by Frederick Morgan Padelford, New York, Macmillan, 1912
"Poems of Henry Howard", article
Spenser Allusions : In the Sixteenth and Seventeenth Centuries, compiled by  Frederick Morgan Padelford, edited by  William Wells
George Dana Boardman Pepper: a Biographical Sketch by Frederick Morgan Padelford, published by L. Phillips, 1914
Essays on the Study and Use of Poetry by Plutarch and Basil the Great, Volume 15 by Frederick Morgan Padelford, published by H. Holt, 1902
The Songs of Rawlinson Ms. C813, Issue 1 by Frederick Morgan Padelford and Allen Rogers Benham, 1909
The Axiochus of Plato by Plato, translated by Edmund Spenser, edited by Frederick Morgan Padelford

References

1875 births
1942 deaths
Colby College alumni
Yale University alumni
University of Washington faculty
Presidents of the Modern Language Association